Gabalfa is a district and community in the north of the city of Cardiff, capital of Wales. It is characterised by a four-lane fly over road at the Gabalfa Interchange, where the A48 road meets the A470 road (North Road) which leads from Cardiff to northern Wales, and the A469 road (Caerphilly Road).

The name is derived from the Welsh 'Ceubalfa', which is literally translated as 'place of the boat'. It was formerly the site of a ferry crossing across the River Taff, upon which a school is now built. The area was first heavily developed in the 1880s, with most of the characteristic terraced housing originating from the next 30 years of construction.

The area around St. Joseph's Church near to Companies House is known as 'the Colonies' due to the number of street names after former British colonies, including Australia Road, Newfoundland Road and many more.

Education

Primary 
Gabalfa has three primary schools, with a combined attendance of more than 720:

 St. Joseph's (Roman Catholic) Primary School
 Allensbank Primary School
 Ysgol Mynydd Bychan ('Heath School' in Welsh), which teaches in the Welsh medium.

Gabalfa Primary school is not within modern Gabalfa but is in neighbouring Llandaff North.

Secondary 
Gabalfa has one secondary school, Cathays High School, which serves around 900 students (mainly from outside Gabalfa)

University 
Gabalfa has a high student population. Several halls of residence for Cardiff University are in Gabalfa, housing about 3,100 students, around 10% of the student body. Liberty House serves mainly medical and nursing students at the nearly University Hospital of Wales. In addition, many students live in privately rented accommodation in the area.

Places of worship

Churches in Gabalfa include St Mark's on North Road (Church in Wales), St Joseph's on New Zealand Road (Roman Catholic), and the All Nations Church on Eastern Avenue (colocated with the All Nations Centre).

Politics

The electoral ward of Gabalfa lies within the parliamentary constituency of Cardiff North, which has been represented since 2017 by Welsh Labour MP Anna McMorrin. In the Senedd, Cardiff North is represented by Welsh Labour MS Julie Morgan.

There is no community council for the area. Gabalfa was served by two councillors: Ed Bridges (Liberal Democrat), elected in 2004, and Gareth Holden, elected in 2012. Holden was elected as a Liberal Democrat but resigned from the party in 2013. He lost out to a Liberal Democrat candidate in the May 2017 election. The ward is currently served by Rhys Taylor and Ashley Wood (2019).

It is bounded by Birchgrove and Heath to the north, Cathays and Maindy to the south, and Llandaff North to the northwest.

Transport
The area is known for the Gabalfa Interchange (or Gabalfa flyover), where the A48 Eastern Avenue, A470 North Road, and the A469 Whitchurch Road (south)/Caerphilly Road (north) meet. The interchange is known for its suicides and suicide attempts, although efforts have been made to improve this, with signs to suicide prevention charities now clearly visible on the pedestrian bridge over Eastern Avenue.

Bus 
Cardiff Bus' service 35 bus circles the area before heading to Cardiff Bay via Cathays and Central station. Services 1/2 Bay Circle run along Western Avenue towards Heath or Llandaff. Additionally, the following services stop at the Gabalfa Interchange:

8 (University Hospital of Wales) or (Cathays-Roath-Central Station-Grangetown-Cardiff Bay)
9 (University Hospital of Wales) or (International Sports Village)
21 (Rhiwbina-Coryton-Whitchurch) or (Central Stn)
23 (Whitchurch-Coryton-Rhiwbina) or (Central Stn)
24 (Whitchurch-Llandaff North-Pontcanna-Llandaff)
25 (Central Stn)
27 Capital City Green (Heath-Birchgrove-Thornhill) or (Central Stn)
35 (Gabalfa) or (Cathays-Central Stn-Cardiff Bay)

Rail 
There are no railway stations located within Gabalfa, although a new railway station serving the ward was proposed by the County Council in 2000. The nearest railway stations are Heath Low Level and Heath High Level to the north-west, Cathays to the south and Llandaf railway station to the north-east.

Walking and Cycling 
The Taff Trail long-distance footpath and cycle route runs along the River Taff, and is connected to Gabalfa by Llys Tal-y-Bont Road.  Cardiff council has plans to build Cycleway 1 along Allensbank Road on the edge of the area. To promote cycling and improve safety, in recent years councillors and residents have campaigned with some success for traffic calming measures, such as Gabalfa becoming a 20-mile per hour zone, raised crossings being installed, and curbs being narrowed.

Gabalfa is within a 30-minute walk or a 10-minute cycle of the city centre.

Gallery

References

External links

 The History of Cardiff's Suburbs - Gabalfa
Geograph - Photos of Gabalfa, Cardiff
St. Joseph's R.C. Primary School
Allensbank Primary School
Ysgol Mynydd Bychan
Cathays High School

Communities in Cardiff
Politics of Cardiff
Districts of Cardiff
Cardiff electoral wards